Joggler may refer to:
Joggling, sport combining juggling and jogging
O2 Joggler, internet computing appliance